James L. Applegate (June 9, 1931 — October 5, 2016) was an American politician and lawyer who served in the Wyoming Senate from 1989 to 1997, representing the 8th legislative district of Wyoming as a Democrat in the 50th, 51st, 52nd, and 53rd Wyoming Legislatures. He served as Senate Minority Leader from 1995 to 1996.

Early life and education
Applegate was born in Torrington, Wyoming on June 9, 1931 to Lucille Applegate and L.G. "Red" Applegate. He graduated from Torrington High School in 1949. He attended the University of Notre Dame, graduating with a degree in 1953. Applegate then attended the University of Wyoming College of Law, graduating with a Bachelor of Laws degree in 1958.

Career
Applegate was a United States Marine Corps veteran, serving on active duty as second lieutenant from 1953 to 1955.

Applegate was Assistant City Attorney for Cheyenne from 1959 to 1962. He also served on positions for various other organizations, including the Board of Public Utilities, the Cheyenne Symphony Foundation, the State Board of Law Examiners, the Urban Renewal Advisory Committee, and the Wyoming Retirement State Board.

Applegate was a founder of the law firm Hirst & Applegate.

Applegate served two terms in the Wyoming Senate, representing the 8th legislative district of Wyoming as a Democrat from 1989 to 1997. He served as Senate Minority Leader from 1995 to 1996.

During his time in office, Applegate served on the Community Development Authority and the Board of Law Examiners. He also served on the following standing committees.
Agriculture, Public Lands and Water Resources
Journal
Labor and Federal Relations

Awards and honors
Applegate was named Person of the Year by the Greater Cheyenne Chamber of Commerce in 1988. He received the Community Spirit Award from the Wyoming Tribune Eagle in 2011.

Personal life and death
Applegate had a wife and two children, Amy and Dan.

Throughout the course of his life, Applegate volunteered for United Way, Meals on Wheels, and Habitat for Humanity.

Applegate died at the age of 75 in Cheyenne, Wyoming on October 5, 2016.

Notes

References

External links
Official page at the Wyoming Legislature

1931 births
2016 deaths
20th-century American politicians
20th-century American lawyers
Wyoming lawyers
Democratic Party Wyoming state senators
United States Marines
University of Notre Dame alumni
University of Wyoming alumni
Military personnel from Wyoming
People from Cheyenne, Wyoming
People from Torrington, Wyoming